Andre Soukhamthath (born October 23, 1988) is a retired American mixed martial artist who competed in the Bantamweight division. A professional mixed martial artist from 2011 until 2022, he had competed in the Ultimate Fighting Championship and CES MMA.

Background
Born and raised in Woonsocket, Rhode Island, into an immigrant family of Laotian descent. Soukhamthath began competing in soccer as a youngster where he was a standout goalie. He began training in mixed martial arts in 2009. He is the first Laotian American fighter signed to the UFC.

Mixed martial arts career

Early career
Soukhamthath compiled an amateur record of 1-2 before making his professional debut in 2011. He competed on the regional scene, almost exclusively for CES MMA in his native state of Rhode Island.

He was the reigning CES MMA Bantamweight Champion when he was signed to the UFC in early 2017.

Ultimate Fighting Championship
Soukhamthath made his promotional debut on March 4, 2017 against Albert Morales at UFC 209. He lost the back-and-forth fight by split decision.

Soukhamthath faced Alejandro Pérez on August 5, 2017 at UFC Fight Night 114. He lost the fight by split decision.

Soukhamthath replaced Bryan Caraway to take on Luke Sanders on December 9, 2017 at UFC Fight Night: Swanson vs. Ortega. He won the fight via TKO in the second round to gain his first UFC win.

On December 22, 2017 Soukhamthath announced to have signed a new, five-fight contract with UFC.

Soukhamthath faced Sean O'Malley at UFC 222. He lost the fight by unanimous decision. This fight earned him the Fight of the Night bonus.

Soukhamthath faced Gavin Tucker on October 27, 2018 at UFC Fight Night 138. However, Tucker pulled out of the fight in early October citing an undisclosed injury and was replaced by promotional newcomer Jonathan Martinez. He won the fight via unanimous decision.

Soukhamthath faced Montel Jackson on April 13, 2019 at UFC 236 He lost the fight by unanimous decision.

Soukhamthath faced Su Mudaerji on August 31, 2019 on UFC on ESPN+ 15. He lost the fight via unanimous decision, and was subsequently released from the promotion.

Post-UFC career

Return to CES MMA
Soukhamthath was scheduled to face Da’Mon Blackshear in a bantamweight out at CES MMA 61 on April 24, 2020. However, the event was postponed due to the COVID-19 pandemic.

XFC
In late 2020,  signed a three-fight contract with Xtreme Fighting Championships. He made his promotional debut against Guilherme Faria at XFC 43 on November 11, 2020. He won the bout via split decision.

Soukhamthath faced José Alberto Quiñónez at XFC 44 on May 28, 2021. He lost the bout via unanimous decision.

CES MMA
Soukhamthath headlined CES MMA 66 against Diego Silva on March 4, 2022. He lost the bout via unanimous decision. After the bout, Soukhamthath placed his gloves in the middle of the cage and announced his retirement from MMA.

Personal life
Andre and his wife Jamie have had three children; their firstborn – LeAndre – had epidermolysis bullosa and passed away at the age of nine months.

Championships and accomplishments
 Ultimate Fighting Championship
Fight of the Night (One time)  vs. Sean O’Malley
CES MMA
CES MMA Bantamweight Championship (One time; former)
One successful title defense

Mixed martial arts record

|-
|Loss
|align=center|14–10
|Diego Silva
|Decision (unanimous)
|CES MMA 66
|
|align=center|5
|align=center|5:00
|Lincoln, Rhode Island, United States
|
|-
|Loss
|align=center|14–9
|José Alberto Quiñónez
|Decision (unanimous)
|XFC 44
|
|align=center|3
|align=center|5:00
|Des Moines, Iowa, United States
|
|-
|Win
|align=center|14–8
|Guilherme Faria
|Decision (split)
|XFC 43
|
|align=center|3
|align=center|5:00
|Atlanta, Georgia, United States
|
|-
|Loss
|align=center|13–8
|Su Mudaerji
|Decision (unanimous)
|UFC Fight Night: Andrade vs. Zhang 
|
|align=center|3
|align=center|5:00
|Shenzhen, China
|
|-
|Loss
|align=center|13–7
|Montel Jackson
|Decision (unanimous)
|UFC 236 
|
|align=center|3
|align=center|5:00
|Atlanta, Georgia, United States
|
|-
|Win
|align=center|13–6
|Jonathan Martinez
|Decision (unanimous)
|UFC Fight Night: Volkan vs. Smith 
|
|align=center|3
|align=center|5:00
|Moncton, New Brunswick, Canada
|
|- 
|Loss
|align=center|12–6
|Sean O'Malley
|Decision (unanimous)
|UFC 222 
|
|align=center|3
|align=center|5:00
|Las Vegas, Nevada, United States
|
|-
|Win
|align=center|12–5
|Luke Sanders
|TKO (punches)
|UFC Fight Night: Swanson vs. Ortega 
|
|align=center|2
|align=center|1:06
|Fresno, California, United States
|
|-
|Loss
|align=center|11–5
|Alejandro Pérez
|Decision (split)
|UFC Fight Night: Pettis vs. Moreno
|
|align=center|3
|align=center|5:00
|Mexico City, Mexico
|
|-
|Loss
|align=center|11–4
|Albert Morales
|Decision (split)
|UFC 209
|
|align=center| 3
|align=center| 5:00
|Las Vegas, Nevada, United States
|
|-
|Win
|align=center|11–3
|Kin Moy
|TKO (knee and punches)
|CES MMA 37
|
|align=center| 2
|align=center| 2:32
|Lincoln, Rhode Island, United States
|
|-
|Win
|align=center|10–3
|Kody Nordby
|KO (flying knee)
|CES MMA 33
|
|align=center| 5
|align=center| 1:35
|Lincoln, Rhode Island, United States
|
|-
|Win
|align=center|9–3
|Carlos Galindo
|TKO (elbows)
|CES MMA 31
|
|align=center| 2
|align=center| 3:46
|Lincoln, Rhode Island, United States
|
|-
|Loss
|align=center|8–3
|Brian Kelleher
|Decision (unanimous)
|CES MMA 28
|
|align=center| 3
|align=center| 5:00
|Lincoln, Rhode Island, United States
|
|-
|Win
|align=center|8–2
|Tom English
|Submission (rear-naked choke)
|CES MMA 26
|
|align=center|2
|align=center|2:17
|Lincoln, Rhode Island, United States
|
|-
|Loss
|align=center|7–2
|Kin Moy
|Decision (unanimous)
|CES MMA 21
|
|align=center|3
|align=center|5:00
|Lincoln, Rhode Island, United States
|
|-
|Win
|align=center|7–1
|Corey Simmons
|TKO (retirement)
|CES MMA 20
|
|align=center|1
|align=center|5:00
|Lincoln, Rhode Island, United States
|
|-
|Win
|align=center|6–1
|Billy Vaughn
|Submission (keylock)
|CES MMA 19
|
|align=center|1
|align=center|3:39
|Lincoln, Rhode Island, United States
|
|-
|Win
|align=center|5–1
|Blair Tugman
|Decision (unanimous)
|CES MMA 17
|
|align=center|3
|align=center|5:00
|Lincoln, Rhode Island, United States
|
|-
|Win
|align=center|4–1
|Kurt Chase-Patrick
|TKO (punches)
|CES MMA 15
|
|align=center|2
|align=center|0:45
|Lincoln, Rhode Island, United States
|
|-
|Win
|align=center|3–1
|Rob Costa	
|TKO (doctor stoppage)
|CES MMA 13
|
|align=center|2
|align=center|4:44
|Providence, Rhode Island, United States
|
|-
|Win
|align=center|2–1
|Vinny Tisconie
|KO (punches)
|CES MMA 11
|
|align=center|1
|align=center|2:06
|Lincoln, Rhode Island, United States
|
|-
|Win
|align=center|1–1
|Gilvan Santos
|Submission (guillotine choke)
|CES MMA 9
|
|align=center|2
|align=center|0:44
|Lincoln, Rhode Island, United States
|
|-
|Loss
|align=center|0–1
|Robbie Slade
|Decision (majority)
|Cage Titans 6
|
|align=center|3
|align=center|5:00
|Plymouth, Massachusetts, United States
|

See also
 List of current UFC fighters
 List of male mixed martial artists

References

External links
 
 

Living people
American male mixed martial artists
American people of Laotian descent
Bantamweight mixed martial artists
Mixed martial artists from Rhode Island
People from Providence County, Rhode Island
Sportspeople from Providence, Rhode Island
1988 births
Ultimate Fighting Championship male fighters